The Roman Catholic St. Mary's Cathedral Basilica of the Assumption in Covington, Kentucky, is a minor basilica in the United States. Construction of the cathedral began under the Diocese of Covington's third bishop, Camillus Paul Maes, in 1895 to replace an 1834 frame church that was inadequate for the growing congregation. Pope Pius XII elevated the cathedral to the rank of minor basilica December 8, 1953.

Description
The sanctuary was designed by Detroit architect Leon Coquard and is inspired by the Notre Dame Cathedral in Paris. Services were first held in 1901 with the Madison Avenue façade, designed by local architect David Davis, added between 1908 and 1910. The structure is constructed of Bedford stone and the roofs are covered with red ludovici tile. The cathedral project terminated in 1915, though it remains incomplete to this day with the planned  towers unbuilt.

The restoration of the cathedral earned a 2002 Preservation Award from the Cincinnati Preservation Association. For the interior restoration, Conrad Schmitt Studios cleaned the stone ribs, tracery and walls. Studio artists also restored plaster and select faux stone painting.

The interior was modeled after St. Denis in France. It contains murals by Covington native Frank Duveneck with the high altar carved from Carrara marble with floors of Rosata and Breche marble.

Located in the North Transept of the cathedral, the upper portion depicts the Coronation of Mary after her Assumption. The lower portion is a depiction of the Ecumenical Council of Ephesus in 431 AD that proclaimed Mary the 'Theotokos' (God-Bearer or Mother of God). The window was created by Mayer and Company of Munich, Germany, and installed in 1911. It was fully restored in 2001.

The cathedral houses three pipe organs. The south transept gallery holds the pipe organ designed by Henry Willis III during his tenure at the Wicks Organ Company of Highland, Illinois. This organ was blessed on February 12, 1933, in a ceremony that also commemorated the anniversary of Pope Pius XI's coronation. Originally a three-manual console with 43 ranks of pipes, Aultz-Kersting Organ renovated and enlarged this instrument in 1982 to four-manuals with 65 ranks.

The west gallery, below the rose window, is occupied by the two-manual organ originally built for St. Joseph Roman Catholic Church in Covington, Kentucky, in 1858 by Mathais Schwab of Cincinnati, Ohio. When the St. Joseph building was razed in 1970, the Schwab organ was moved to St Mary's. The Schwab organ was altered to fit the new location, but retains most of its original components, including its mechanical key and stop actions, ivory keyboards and faux-grained casework. It contains 21 ranks. In 2002, the cathedral purchased a one-manual, 20-rank portable organ for use in various parts of the sanctuary.

In June 2021, 24 statues were installed in the long empty niches at the cathedral's entrance to complete the building's long unfinished façade. The statues were designed by the Pennsylvania-based artist Neilson Carlin, with each honoring various parishes and institutions located within the diocese. They are made of Bedford limestone, reportedly sourced from the same quarry which provided material for the original construction of the church. Above the northernmost door is a tympanum depicting the Annunciation. From left to right, the statues depict Saint John the Baptist; Saint Barbara; Saint James the Great; Saint Agnes; Saint William of York; and Saint Timothy. A tympanum depicting the Assumption of Mary sits above the central doors, with a statue of Mary presiding between them. From left to right, the eight additional statues depict Pope Saint Pius X; Saint Patrick; Saint Benedict; Saint Joseph; Saint Boniface; Saint Henry; Saint Catherine of Siena; and Saint Charles Borromeo. A tympanum of the Coronation of Mary sits above the southernmost doors. From left to right, the statues depict Saint Augustine; Saint Thérèse of Lisieux; Saint Anne; Saint Bernard; Saint Rose of Lima; and Saint John the Evangelist. Four additional statues reside on niches located on the front buttresses of the cathedral. From north to south they depict: Saint Thomas More; Saint Paul; Saint Peter; and Saint Elizabeth of Hungary.

See also
List of Catholic cathedrals in the United States
List of cathedrals in the United States

References

External links

Official Cathedral Site
Roman Catholic Diocese of Covington Official Site
Interactive panoramas of the basilica
Schwab organ
Wicks organ

Assumption in Covington, Cathedral Basilica of the
Assumption in Covington, Cathedral Basilica of the
Roman Catholic Diocese of Covington
National Register of Historic Places in Kenton County, Kentucky
Roman Catholic churches in Covington, Kentucky
Churches on the National Register of Historic Places in Kentucky
Gothic Revival church buildings in Kentucky
1901 establishments in Kentucky
Churches completed in 1901